Kosmos 95 ( meaning Cosmos 95), also known as DS-U2-V No.2, was a Soviet satellite which was launched in 1965 as part of the Dnepropetrovsk Sputnik programme.

A Kosmos-2M 63S1M carrier rocket was used to launch Kosmos 95 into low Earth orbit. The launch took place from Site 86/1 at Kapustin Yar. The launch occurred at 05:31 GMT on 4 November 1965, and resulted in the successful insertion of the satellite into orbit. Upon reaching orbit, the satellite was assigned its Kosmos designation, and received the International Designator 1965-088A. The North American Air Defense Command assigned it the catalogue number 01706.

Kosmos 95 was the second of four DS-U2-V satellites to be launched. On 18 January 1966, it decayed from orbit and reentered the atmosphere.

See also

 1965 in spaceflight

References

Spacecraft launched in 1965
Kosmos satellites
Dnepropetrovsk Sputnik program